Berlin is a borough in Camden County, in the U.S. state of New Jersey. As of the 2020 United States census, the borough's population was 7,489, a decrease of 99 (−1.3%) from the 2010 census count of 7,588, which in turn reflected an increase of 1,439 (+23.4%) from the 6,149 counted in the 2000 census.

Berlin was incorporated as a borough on March 29, 1927, from portions of Berlin Township, based on the results of a referendum held on April 26, 1927.

History 
What is now Berlin was known in earlier times as "Longacoming." The Lenape Native Americans used Lonaconing Trail to describe the travel route that ran through the area, connecting the Jersey Shore to the Delaware River. Another tradition cites early European visitors who found a stream at the head of the Great Egg Harbor River and appreciated the respite as being "long a coming".

Long-a-Coming became a stopping point for stagecoaches located at the halfway point between Philadelphia and Atlantic City. Upon the creation of Camden County in 1844, it was briefly named the county seat (while the area was still a part of Waterford Township), until 1848 when the seat moved to the city of Camden. A rail line was laid in 1853. Three years later, the Long-a-Coming railroad station was built. In February 1867, the station was renamed "Magnolia". This caused confusion because there was a community called Magnolia nearby. Three months later, the station's name changed to Berlin. The name "Berlin" may have been chosen as a reference to the city of Berlin in Germany, though the derivation is uncertain.

Geography
According to the United States Census Bureau, the borough had a total area of 3.61 square miles (9.34 km2), including 3.59 square miles (9.31 km2) of land and 0.01 square miles (0.04 km2) of water (0.39%).

The borough borders the Camden County municipalities of Berlin Township, Clementon, Lindenwold, Pine Hill, Waterford Township and Winslow Township.

The borough is one of 56 South Jersey municipalities that are included within the New Jersey Pinelands National Reserve, a protected natural area of unique ecology covering , that has been classified as a United States Biosphere Reserve and established by Congress in 1978 as the nation's first National Reserve. Part of the borough is included in the state-designated Pinelands Area, which includes portions of Camden County, along with areas in Atlantic, Burlington, Cape May, Cumberland, Gloucester and Ocean counties.

Demographics

2010 census

The Census Bureau's 2006–2010 American Community Survey showed that (in 2010 inflation-adjusted dollars) median household income was $65,771 (with a margin of error of +/− $8,475) and the median family income was $79,347 (+/− $13,820). Males had a median income of $53,102 (+/− $7,153) versus $47,292 (+/− $13,458) for females. The per capita income for the borough was $33,672 (+/− $5,917). About 4.4% of families and 6.6% of the population were below the poverty line, including 9.2% of those under age 18 and 3.9% of those age 65 or over.

2000 census
As of the 2000 United States census there were 6,149 people, 2,205 households, and 1,660 families residing in the borough. The racial makeup of the borough was 94.06% White, 2.18% African American, 0.21% Native American, 1.69% Asian, 0.07% Pacific Islander, 0.49% from other races, and 1.30% from two or more races. Hispanic or Latino of any race were 2.11% of the population.

There were 2,205 households, out of which 33.6% had children under the age of 18 living with them, 60.3% were married couples living together, 11.4% had a female householder with no husband present, and 24.7% were non-families. 19.6% of all households were made up of individuals, and 7.9% had someone living alone who was 65 years of age or older. The average household size was 2.76 and the average family size was 3.19.

In the borough the population was spread out, with 24.6% under the age of 18, 6.7% from 18 to 24, 30.3% from 25 to 44, 24.7% from 45 to 64, and 13.6% who were 65 years of age or older. The median age was 38 years. For every 100 females, there were 98.1 males. For every 100 females age 18 and over, there were 93.0 males.

The median income for a household in the borough was $60,286, and the median income for a family was $68,704. Males had a median income of $44,211 versus $31,980 for females. The per capita income for the borough was $24,675. About 1.9% of families and 3.5% of the population were below the poverty line, including 2.7% of those under age 18 and 5.7% of those age 65 or over.

Government

Local government
Berlin is governed under the Borough form of New Jersey municipal government, which is used in 218 (of the 565) municipalities statewide, making it the most common form of government in New Jersey. The governing body is comprised of a Mayor and a Borough Council, with all positions elected at-large on a partisan basis as part of the November general election. A Mayor is elected directly by the voters to a four-year term of office. The Borough Council is comprised of six members elected to serve three-year terms on a staggered basis, with two seats coming up for election each year in a three-year cycle. The Borough form of government used by Berlin is a "weak mayor / strong council" government in which council members act as the legislative body with the mayor presiding at meetings and voting only in the event of a tie. The mayor can veto ordinances subject to an override by a two-thirds majority vote of the council. The mayor makes committee and liaison assignments for council members, and most appointments are made by the mayor with the advice and consent of the council.

, the Mayor of Berlin Borough is Independent Rick Miller, whose term of office ends December 31, 2023. Members of the Borough Council are Council President James Pearce (I, 2022), Leonard Badolato (I, 2023), Patricia Cummings (R, 2024), Keith Hohing (R, 2023), Jacob "Jake" Miller (R, 2024) and Andy Simone (I, 2022).

In January 2020, the Borough Council appointed Patricia Cummings to fill the seat expiring in December 2021 that had been held by Ron Rocco until he resigned from office and also appointed Jake Miller to fill the seat expiring in December 2020 that had been held by Rick Miller until he stepped down to take office as a mayor.

In September 2019, Keith Hohing was appointed to serve the term expiring in December 2021 that had been held by Mike Buchanan until he resigned after purchasing a home outside of Berlin Borough.

In May 2019, the Borough Council selected Andy Simone to fill the seat expiring in December 2019 that had been vacated by Daniel MacDonell until he resigned from office the previous month.

Federal, state and county representation
Berlin Borough is located in the 1st Congressional District and is part of New Jersey's 8th state legislative district. Prior to the 2011 reapportionment following the 2010 Census, Berlin Borough had been in the 6th state legislative district.

Politics
As of March 2011, there were a total of 5,225 registered voters in Berlin, of which 1,731 (33.1% vs. 31.7% countywide) were registered as Democrats, 1,044 (20.0% vs. 21.1%) were registered as Republicans and 2,450 (46.9% vs. 47.1%) were registered as Unaffiliated. There were no voters registered to other parties. Among the borough's 2010 Census population, 68.9% (vs. 57.1% in Camden County) were registered to vote, including 89.2% of those ages 18 and over (vs. 73.7% countywide).

In the 2012 presidential election, Democrat Barack Obama received 1,851 votes (50.9% vs. 54.8% countywide), ahead of Republican Mitt Romney with 1,720 votes (47.3% vs. 43.5%) and other candidates with 44 votes (1.2% vs. 0.9%), among the 3,635 ballots cast by the borough's 5,478 registered voters, for a turnout of 66.4% (vs. 70.4% in Camden County). In the 2008 presidential election, Democrat Barack Obama received 1,993 votes (52.2% vs. 66.2% countywide), ahead of Republican John McCain with 1,724 votes (45.2% vs. 30.7%) and other candidates with 45 votes (1.2% vs. 1.1%), among the 3,817 ballots cast by the borough's 5,281 registered voters, for a turnout of 72.3% (vs. 71.4% in Camden County). In the 2004 presidential election, Democrat John Kerry received 1,842 votes (50.2% vs. 61.7% countywide), ahead of Republican George W. Bush with 1,766 votes (48.2% vs. 36.4%) and other candidates with 38 votes (1.0% vs. 0.8%), among the 3,667 ballots cast by the borough's 4,790 registered voters, for a turnout of 76.6% (vs. 71.3% in the whole county).

In the 2013 gubernatorial election, Republican Chris Christie received 65.1% of the vote (1,255 cast), ahead of Democrat Barbara Buono with 33.4% (645 votes), and other candidates with 1.5% (29 votes), among the 1,975 ballots cast by the borough's 5,487 registered voters (46 ballots were spoiled), for a turnout of 36.0%. In the 2009 gubernatorial election, Republican Chris Christie received 1,261 votes (52.0% vs. 38.5% countywide), ahead of Democrat Jon Corzine with 989 votes (40.8% vs. 53.8%), Independent Chris Daggett with 120 votes (5.0% vs. 4.5%) and other candidates with 16 votes (0.7% vs. 1.1%), among the 2,423 ballots cast by the borough's 5,126 registered voters, yielding a 47.3% turnout (vs. 40.8% in the county).

Historic district

The Berlin Historic District is a  national historic district along Washington, East Taunton, and Haines avenues and parts of South White Horse Pike, Jackson Road, and Jefferson Avenue in the community. It was added to the National Register of Historic Places on April 14, 1995 for its significance in architecture and community development. The district includes 65 contributing buildings.

The Victorian-style John Westcott House on Washington Avenue was built in the 1860s and features a cupola. The Dr. William C. Raughley House was built 1888–1889 with Queen Anne style and is a key contributing property. The Victorian house at 18 Washington Avenue was built in 1865. The Victorian Joseph N. Ross House was built in 1870 and features a scalloped vergeboard and spindlework.

Education
The Berlin Borough School District serves public school students in pre-kindergarten through eighth grade at Berlin Community School. As of the 2021–22 school year, the district, comprised of one school, had an enrollment of 802 students and 73.6 classroom teachers (on an FTE basis), for a student–teacher ratio of 10.9:1. Many Community Education and Recreation (CER) programs are held at Berlin Community School, including preschool and after school programs.

Public school students in ninth through twelfth grades attend the Eastern Camden County Regional High School District, a limited-purpose, public regional school district that serves students at Eastern Regional High School from the constituent communities of Berlin Borough, Gibbsboro and Voorhees Township. As of the 2021–22 school year, the high school had an enrollment of 1,998 students and 137.0 classroom teachers (on an FTE basis), for a student–teacher ratio of 14.6:1. Seats on the nine-member board of education are allocated based on population, with Berlin Borough assigned two seats on the board.

Students from Berlin Borough, and from all of Camden County, are eligible to attend the Camden County Technical Schools, a countywide public school district that serves the vocational and technical education needs of students at the high school and post-secondary level at the Gloucester Township Campus in the Sicklerville section of Gloucester Township or the Pennsauken Camps in Pennsauken Township. Students are accepted based on district admission standards and costs of attendance and transportation are covered by the home district of each student.

Our Lady of Mount Carmel Regional School, founded in 1956, is an elementary school that operates under the auspices of the Roman Catholic Diocese of Camden servingstudents in grades PreK-8.

Transportation

Roads and highways 

U.S. Route 30 is the main highway serving Berlin. New Jersey Route 73 also brushes the east side of the borough.

Public transportation 
NJ Transit bus service is available in the borough on the 554 route, which operates between the Lindenwold train station and Atlantic City.

Camden County Airport is located one mile southwest of the central business district.

Berlin was formerly served by the Berlin Railroad Station.

Notable people

People who were born in, residents of, or otherwise closely associated with Berlin include:

 Rachel Dawson (born 1985), field hockey midfielder
 Sarah Dawson (born 1982), field hockey forward / midfielder
 Kyle Maack (born 1992), R&B and soul singer
 Walter E. Pedersen (1911–1998), union leader and politician who served as Mayor of Clementon and a two-year term in the New Jersey General Assembly
 Kelly Ripa (born 1970), host of Live with Kelly and soap opera actress
 Logan Ryan (born 1991), cornerback who plays in the NFL for the New York Giants

References

External links

 Berlin Borough municipal website
 Berlin Community School
 
 School Data for the Berlin Community School, National Center for Education Statistics
 Eastern Camden County Regional High School District
 Our Town: Berlin Township

 
1927 establishments in New Jersey
Borough form of New Jersey government
Boroughs in Camden County, New Jersey
Populated places established in 1927